Rougiers is a commune in the Var department in the Provence-Alpes-Côte d'Azur region in southeastern France.

It was the site of influential medieval excavations by the French archaeologist Gabrielle Démians d'Archimbaud.

See also
Communes of the Var department

References

Communes of Var (department)